Patrick Jones may refer to:

Patrick Jones (poet) (born 1965), Welsh poet
Patrick Jones (author) (born 1961), librarian and author
Patrick Jones (footballer) (born 2003), Welsh footballer
Patrick Jones II (born 1998), American football player
Patrick Henry Jones (1830–1900), American lawyer, public servant and postmaster of New York City
Patrick J. Jones (fl. 1980s–2010s), Irish artist, teacher, and author
Patrick Lloyd Jones or Lloyd Jones (1811–1886), Anglo-Irish socialist and union activist
Patrick Stanfield Jones (f. 1990s–2010s), musician, producer, arranger and singer-songwriter

See also
Pat Jones (disambiguation)